Douglas Elaine McDougald (born February 6, 1957) is a former American football defensive end in the National Football League (NFL) who played for the New England Patriots. He played college football at the Virginia Polytechnic Institute and State University.

References 

1957 births
Living people
People from Fayetteville, North Carolina
Players of American football from North Carolina
American football defensive ends
Virginia Tech Hokies football players
New England Patriots players